Remember Pearl Harbor was a slogan or saying popular in the United States after the Japanese attack on Pearl Harbor on December 7, 1941. Commander  Lewis Preston Harris first coined the phrase "Remember Pearl Harbor".

It was also the name of a song by artist Sammy Kaye, sometimes cited as "Let's Remember Pearl Harbor," recorded ten days after the outbreak of the war.

Another song of the same title was written by Frank Luther and performed by Carson J. Robison and his orchestra.

See also
 Remember Pearl Harbor (motion picture)

References

External links
 Use of the song during a patriotic rally at a Garrett, Indiana, high school in January 1942, with lyrics. Garrett Clipper via Newspapers.com 

 
Attack on Pearl Harbor
Slogans
United States home front during World War II
United States in World War II
1940s neologisms